Lee Hyun-jin (born May 15, 1984) is a South Korean football player.

Honours

Club
Suwon Bluewings
 K League Classic Champions (1) : 2008
 Korean FA Cup Winners (2) : 2009, 2010
 Korean League Cup Winners (2) : 2005, 2008
 Korean Super Cup Winners (1) : 2005

External links

1984 births
Living people
South Korean footballers
Association football wingers
Suwon Samsung Bluewings players
Jeju United FC players
Lee Hyun-jin
Lee Hyun-jin
Lee Hyun-jin
K League 1 players
Lee Hyun-jin
Lee Hyun-jin
South Korean expatriate footballers
South Korean expatriate sportspeople in Thailand
Expatriate footballers in Thailand